Warea is a genus of plants. Species include Warea cuneifolia, Warea amplexifolia, Warea sessilifolia, and Warea carteri. Several live in Florida. Warea is in the family Brassicaceae.

References

Brassicaceae
Brassicaceae genera